Xenia Peni (born February 28, 1983) is a Papua New Guinean former swimmer, who specialized in breaststroke events. Peni represented Papua New Guinea, as a 17-year-old, at the 2000 Summer Olympics, where she became the nation's first female flag bearer in the opening ceremony.

Peni competed only in the women's 100 m breaststroke at the 2000 Summer Olympics in Sydney. She received a ticket from FINA, under a Universality program, in an entry time of 1:18.58. She challenged seven other swimmers in heat two, including Bolivia's 26-year-old Katerine Moreno and Angola's Nádia Cruz, who competed in her fourth Olympic Games at age 25. She trailed behind Cruz in a spirited challenge by five-hundredths of a second (0.05) to round out the field in 1:19.62. Peni failed to advance into the semifinals, as she placed thirty-ninth overall in the prelims.

References

External links

1983 births
Living people
Papua New Guinean female swimmers
Olympic swimmers of Papua New Guinea
Swimmers at the 2000 Summer Olympics
Female breaststroke swimmers
People from the National Capital District (Papua New Guinea)